Events from the year 1888 in Sweden

Incumbents
 Monarch – Oscar II
 Prime Minister – Robert Themptander, Gillis Bildt

Events

 6 February – Gillis Bildt assumed the position of prime minister 
 25 June – The Umeå city fire destroyed most of the city of Umeå
 30 September – Elizabeth Stride is murdered in Whitechapel in London.
 The Iron Ore Line is opened. 
 The trade union Swedish Metalworkers' Union is formed.
 The mursmäckas launched a strike in Stockholm to raise their salary. This attracted a great deal of attention because of their gender, and the newspapers called it The Women's Strike.
 The Women's Worker's Club, the first political club for women in Sweden, is founded by Elma Danielsson in Malmö.  
 The temperance activist Emilie Rathou became the first woman in Sweden to demand the right for women suffrage in a public speech.
 The Fotografiska Föreningen (Photographic Society) is founded: the first woman, Anna Hwass, is made a member of the board.
 The morganatic marriage between Prince Oscar and Ebba Munck cause a scandal.
 1888 Sundsvall fire

Births

 26 January - Lisa Steier, ballerina and ballet master  (died 1928).
 18 March – Axel Janse, gymnast (died 1973).
 26 March – Elsa Brändström, nurse and philanthropist (died 1948)
 14 December – Åke Lundeberg, sport shooter (died 1939).
 18 December – Mauritz Eriksson, sport shooter (died 1947).

Deaths
 21 July – Victoria Benedictsson, writer (born 1850)
 7 February  – Aurore von Haxthausen, composer  (born 1830)

References

 
Years of the 19th century in Sweden
Sweden